Puskan (also Romanized as Pūskān; also known as Pāras Kān, Parskān, Pārskhān, Postkān, Pūsgān, Pūshkān, and Pūstgān) is a village in Dadin Rural District, Jereh and Baladeh District, Kazerun County, Fars Province, Iran. At the 2016 census, its population was 222, in 62 families.

References 

Populated places in Kazerun County